Sairocarpus is a genus of the family Plantaginaceae, and is one of a group of plants commonly known as 'snapdragons'. It has ten accepted species and is being considered to include many species formerly considered as New World species of Antirrhinum.

Species 
Species accepted by the Plants of the World Online as of October 2022:

Sairocarpus cornutus 
Sairocarpus costatus 
Sairocarpus coulterianus 
Sairocarpus kingii 
Sairocarpus multiflorus 
Sairocarpus nuttallianus 
Sairocarpus subcordatus 
Sairocarpus vexillocalyculatus 
Sairocarpus virga 
Sairocarpus watsonii

References

Bibliography
 Vargas P, JA Rosselló, R Oyama, J Güemes. 2004 Molecular evidence for naturalness of genera in the tribe Antirrhineae (Scrophulariaceae) and three independent evolutionary lineages from the New World and the Old. Plant Syst Evol 249:151–172.

External links 
 Calflora Images

Plantaginaceae
Plantaginaceae genera